Blackstone Plantation is an old-time radio musical variety program in the United States. It was broadcast on CBS (1929–1930) and on NBC (1930–1934). The program was one of NBC's top-rated programs in 1932.

Personnel
Frank Crumit and Julia Sanderson, a husband-and-wife team who had been headliners in vaudeville, were hosts for the show. Alfred Swenson played Captain Blackstone, Santos Ortega played Don Rodrigo, and Ted de Corsia played Don Philippe. The program also featured guest stars such as Lanny Ross and Parker Fennelly

Ed Herlihy was the program's announcer, and Jack Shilkret's orchestra provided music.

Frank Vallan was the producer when the program was on CBS.

Format
The book Vaudeville old & new: an encyclopedia of variety performances in America summarized the program as follows: "The two stars sang and exchanged banter. Music and gab with guests in their breezy and humorous style characterized their programs." The show was sponsored by Blackstone cigars.

References 

1929 radio programme debuts
1934 radio programme endings
1930s American radio programs
CBS Radio programs
NBC radio programs
American jazz radio programs
American variety radio series